Kyrkjetorget is a flattish ice-filled amphitheatre on the east side of Jøkulkyrkja Mountain in the Mühlig-Hofmann Mountains of Queen Maud Land, Antarctica. It was mapped from surveys and air photos by the Sixth Norwegian Antarctic Expedition (1956–60) and named Kyrkjetorget (the church market place).

References

Cirques of Queen Maud Land
Princess Astrid Coast